The Long Road is the fourth studio album by Canadian rock band Nickelback, released on September 23, 2003. Recorded at the famed Greenhouse Studios in Vancouver, British Columbia,  it is the band's last album with Ryan Vikedal as drummer, and features a notable change in style towards more aggressive riffs tuned down to C or B tuning and the inclusion of double bass drumming.

The album was certified 3× Platinum by the RIAA in March 2005 and it had sold 3,591,000 copies as of April 2011.  It has sold over 5 million copies worldwide and was the only album of 2003 to have sold over 2 million copies worldwide. It debuted at #6 on the Billboard 200 and was ranked #157 on Billboards 200 Albums of the Decade.

Country music singer Travis Tritt released a cover version of the track "Should've Listened" on his 2007 album The Storm.

Track listing
Standard Edition

Singles

Personnel
Credits adapted from album's liner notes.NickelbackChad Kroeger — lead vocals, lead guitar 
Ryan Peake — rhythm guitar, keyboards, backing vocals 
Mike Kroeger — bass, backing vocals
Ryan Vikedal — drumsAdditional musiciansBrian Larsen, Cameron Wilson, Henry Lee, Zoltan Rozsnyai — strings (track 3)
Corrine Youchezin — vocals (track 5)Production'''
Joey Moi — producer, engineer, digital editing
Nickelback — producer
Alex "Laquaysh" Aligizakis — assistant engineer
Ryan Andersen — digital editing
Randy Staub — mixing
Zach Blackstone — mixing assistant
George Marino — mastering

Charts

Weekly charts

Year-end charts

Decade-end charts

Certifications

Tour
The Long Road Tour

 Appearances 
 The song "Saturday Night's Alright for Fighting" was featured on the soundtrack to the movie Charlie's Angels: Full Throttle in 2003.
The song "Learn The Hard Way" was featured on Daredevil: The Album in 2003.
The song "Slow Motion" was featured on The Punisher: The Album in 2004.
The song "Flat on the Floor" was featured in the video games MLB 2005 in 2004 and FlatOut 2 in 2006; the song "Believe It or Not" was also featured in the latter.
 The song "See You at the Show" was featured on the album Harley-Davidson: Ride in 2005.
 In Australia, it was also used on the Nine Network's Friday night Australian Football League coverage in 2005.
 The song "Because of You" was featured in the video games MX vs. ATV Unleashed in 2005 and Guitar Hero World Tour in 2008.
The song "Figured You Out" was featured as downloadable content for the video game Rock Band'' in 2010. The song "Someday" was later included in 2011.

References

External links

2003 albums
Nickelback albums
Roadrunner Records albums
Albums produced by Joey Moi
Albums recorded at Greenhouse Studios